Cláudio de Jesus Ximenes, (b. in Ermera, in the west part of East Timor) is the President of the Court of Appeal of East Timor, first appointed in 2003.

Ximenes was recently reappointed to a third term as Judge and President of the Court of Appeal, the highest judicial authority in the country, analogous to the United States'  Supreme Court. He is also the President of the Superior Council for the Judiciary.

References

External links
Timor-Online article on Dr. Claudio de Jesus Ximenes' reappointment
East Timor News Digest's article on the Luso judiciary alliance

Chief justices of East Timor
Living people
Year of birth missing (living people)
People from Ermera District
University of Lisbon alumni